John M. Rosellini (born 1939) is an American former politician in the state of Washington. He served the 34th district from 1967 to 1973.

References

Living people
1939 births
Politicians from Seattle
Washington (state) lawyers
Democratic Party members of the Washington House of Representatives